Mohammed Ehteshamuddin is a Pakistani TV director, producer, writer and actor. Ehtesham's short films Shahrukh Khan Ki Maut (2005) and Mein Sawa Paanch Bujay Aai Thi (2006) featured at the 2005 and 2006 Kara Film Festival. In addition, his two dramas and a film, Sadqay Tumhare (2014), Aseerzadi and Chambaili (2013) won Hum Award and ARY Film Award nominations. In 2015, he won the Hum Award for Best Director Drama Serial for Sadqay Tumhare.

Early life and career

Mohammed Ehteshamuddin was born in Karachi, growing up in a colony with a lot of migrants from Hyderabad State, including many writers, which he says influenced his early artistic inclination, because as a child he used to frequent literary gatherings involving rehearsal of classical plays as well as short-stories and poetry.

He graduated with a degree in commerce from the Karachi University, working for the Sui Southern Gas Company, and also joined various theater groups, including Tehrik-e-Niswan, Katha and Theatre Circle. In 1998, he was selected by United Nations Development Programme, Pakistan for a course in television production at the Pakistan Television Academy, Islamabad.

In 2013 he performed in the movie Chambaili, for which he was nominated in a Best Supporting Actor and Best Star Debut - Male categories at 1st ARY Film Awards.

Filmography

Television (as director and producer)
 Shahrukh Khan Ki Maut (Death of Shahrukh Khan) (2005)
 Mein Sawa Paanch Bujay Aai Thi (2006)
 Chandda (2007)
 Daar Se Bichray (2007)
 Yeh Hindustan Woh Pakistan (2007) 
 Mukti (2008)
 Baitullaham (2010)
 Perfume Chowk (2010)
 Zaibu ke Paas (2010)
 Chup ka Shor (2011)
 Zaahra (2011)
 Thandi Deewarain (2012)
 Aseerzadi - (2013)
 Zindagi Ab Bhi Muskurati He (2013)
 Sadqay Tumhare (2014)
 Preet Na Kariyo Koi (2015)
 Udaari (2016)
 Aangan (2018)
 Khaab Toot Jaatay Hain (2021)
 Yunhi (2023)

Actor in Dramas 
 Abro as Zafar
 Kitni Girhain Baaki Hain (Ep:7) as Saleem
 Yaqeen Ka Safar (2017) as Khalil
 Yeh Raha Dil  [2017] as Dilber Jahangir 'DJ'
 Khaab Toot Jaatay Hain (2021) as Dr. Sajid Hussain

Film
 2013: Chambaili as Moosa
 2016: Maalik as Master Mohsin
 2016: Actor in Law as Lawyer (Cameo)
 2019: Superstar (director)
 2021: Yorker as Inspector
 Dum Mastam (2022; director)

Writer
 Shahrukh Khan ki Maut (2005)
 Victoria Ka Ticket (2005)
 Mein Sawa Panch Bujay Aai Thi (2006)
 Duniya Goal Hai (2006)
 Yeh Hindustan  Woh Pakistan (2007)

Awards and nominations

References

External links

 official website 
 

Living people
Pakistani television directors
Pakistani television producers
Pakistani television writers
Pakistani male television actors
People from Karachi
Pakistani people of Hyderabadi descent
1965 births
Male television writers